Lions Bridge may refer to one:

 Lions Gate Bridge, a suspension bridge in Vancouver, Canada
 Lions' Bridge, Sofia (Lavov most), a bridge in Sofia, Bulgaria
 Lion Bridge, a bridge in Modesto,  California
 Bridge of Four Lions (Lviny most), a footbridge in Saint Petersburg, Russia
 Bridge of Lions, a bascule bridge in St. Augustine, Florida, United States
 Chain Bridge (Budapest), a suspension bridge in Budapest, Hungary